Victor Ivanovych Hvozd (Ukrainian: Віктор Іванович Гвоздь; 24 May 1959 – 28 May 2021) was a Chief of the Main Intelligence Directorate of the Ministry of Defense of Ukraine and a Chairman of the Foreign Intelligence Service of Ukraine.

Education
Hvozd was born on 24 May 1959 in Skala-Podilska, Borshchiv Raion, Ternopil Oblast.

In 1981 graduated from the M. Frunze Higher Combined-Arms Command School of Kyiv; in 1997 — from the Faculty of Law of the Ivan Franko National University of Lviv; in 2005 — Master's program at Kyiv University of Economics and Law; in 2009 — Military Diplomatic Academy, Master of Military Administration. In 1999, completed a course on the Armed Forces' participation in peacekeeping operations at the Academy of the General Staff of the Armed Forces of Turkey (Istanbul), and in 2009 — security course at the Harvard Kennedy School (Harvard University, Boston, USA).

Career

From 1981, served in the Military Intelligence in the Trans-Baikal and Carpathian Military Districts as a translator of a separate reconnaissance battalion, commander of a reconnaissance company of a motorized rifle regiment, commander of a reconnaissance-airborne company of a separate reconnaissance battalion, officer of the intelligence center of the intelligence directorate of the military district.

Since 1992 — an officer of the Intelligence Center of the Intelligence Directorate at the HQ of the Carpathian Military District. In 1993–1995 participated in peacekeeping operations as part of the UN peacekeeping mission in former Yugoslavia.

Since 1995 — at the Main Directorate of Intelligence of the Ministry of Defense of Ukraine.

Since 1996 — Defense Attaché at the Embassy of Ukraine in Croatia and in Bosnia and Herzegovina (concurrently), since 1999 — in senior positions in the Ministry of Defense of Ukraine, since 2000 — Representative of the Ministry of Defense at the Permanent Mission of Ukraine to the UN, member of the Ukrainian delegation to the UN Security Council.

From 2003 — Deputy Head of the Main Directorate for Law Enforcement Agencies, Military Formations of the Presidential Administration of Ukraine, since 2006 — Head of the Department of Military-Technical Cooperation of the Secretariat of the President of Ukraine.

From January 2008 to August 2010 — the Chief of the Main Intelligence Directorate of the Ministry of Defense of Ukraine.

Hvozd took part in the (November 2013 to February 2014) Euromaidan protests.

In February 2014 — the Commissioner of the Verkhovna Rada of Ukraine for the activities of intelligence agencies of Ukraine.

From February 2014 to April 2016 — the Chairman of the Foreign Intelligence Service of Ukraine.

Since May 2016 until his death — the President of the Independent Analytical Center for Geopolitical Studies “Borysfen Intel”, created on his initiative in 2012.

Death
On May 28, 2021, Hvozd died after drowning during a scuba diving at a depth of several tens of meters at a resort in Dahab, Egypt, at the age of 62.

Other
Hvozd was survived by his wife and two children.

Lieutenant General of the Reserve, Doctor of Military Sciences (specialty “Military Security of the State”), Honored Lawyer of Ukraine.
The author of the book “Military Intelligence of Ukraine at the Turn of the Third Millennium” (2017), and of the monograph “Historical, Legal and Political Aspects of the State's Intelligence Activity” (2018).

Fluent in English, Croatian, Serbian, Chinese.

Hvozd was a recipient of the Order of Merit, III degree.

References 

1959 births
2021 deaths
People from Ternopil Oblast
Lieutenant generals of Ukraine
University of Lviv alumni
Kyiv University of Tourism, Economics, and Law alumni
Harvard Kennedy School alumni
Ukrainian spies
Ukrainian diplomats
People of the Foreign Intelligence Service of Ukraine
People of the Chief Directorate of Intelligence (Ukraine)
Recipients of the Order of Merit (Ukraine), 3rd class
People of the Euromaidan
Deaths by drowning